Björne Väggö (born 9 September 1955) is a Swedish fencer. He won a silver medal in the individual épée event at the 1984 Summer Olympics. He is discussed in "Epee 2.0: The Birth Of The New Fencing Paradigm", and is a contributor to the revised edition: "Epee 2.5: The New Paradigm Revised and Augmented".

Awards
   Swedish Fencing Federation Royal Medal of Merit in gold (Svenska fäktförbundets kungliga förtjänstmedalj i guld) (2011)

References

External links
 

1955 births
Living people
Swedish male épée fencers
Olympic fencers of Sweden
Fencers at the 1984 Summer Olympics
Olympic silver medalists for Sweden
Olympic medalists in fencing
Sportspeople from Malmö
Medalists at the 1984 Summer Olympics
Universiade medalists in fencing
Universiade gold medalists for Sweden
Medalists at the 1981 Summer Universiade
20th-century Swedish people